The 1998 Commonwealth Games were Sri Lanka's 11th appearance in the Commonwealth Games. Sri Lanka won two medals and were ranked 27th on the medal table.

Medals

Silver
 Sriyani Kulawansa - Women's 100 m Hurdles, 12.95 s

Bronze
 Sugath Thilakaratne - Men's 400 m, 44.64 s

Nations at the 1998 Commonwealth Games
C
Sri Lanka at the Commonwealth Games